The Twenty-fifth Oklahoma Legislature was a meeting of the legislative branch of the government of Oklahoma, composed of the Oklahoma Senate and the Oklahoma House of Representatives. The state legislature met in regular session at the Oklahoma State Capitol in Oklahoma City from January 4 to May 27, 1955, during the term of Governor Raymond D. Gary. Gary had just served as President pro tempore of the Oklahoma Senate during the previous session. He was replaced by Ray Fine, who took over as presiding officer of the Oklahoma Senate. Bill Harkey was elected Speaker of the Oklahoma House of Representatives and was the first speaker to serve two consecutive terms.

During the 1955 session, the state legislature approved a legislative referendum to end school segregation, in response to the 1954 Brown v. Topeka Board of Education. It was approved by voters in 1956 by a 3-1 margin.

Dates of session
January 4 to May 27, 1955
Previous: 24th Legislature • Next: 26th Legislature

Party composition

Senate

House of Representatives

Major legislation
Desegregation - House Joint Resolution 504 created a legislative referendum to end school segregation, in response to the 1954 Brown v. Topeka Board of Education. It was approved by voters in 1956 by a 3-1 margin.

Leadership

Democratic
Senate President Pro Tem: Ray Fine
Speaker of the House: B.E. Bill Harkey
Speaker Pro Tempore: Floyd Sumrall
Majority Floor Leader: James Bullard

Republican
Minority Leader: W.A. Burton Jr.

Staff
Carl Staas was the chief clerk of the Oklahoma House of Representatives.

Members

Senate

Table based on 2005 Oklahoma Almanac.

House of Representatives

Table based on government database.

References

Oklahoma legislative sessions
1955 in Oklahoma
1956 in Oklahoma
1955 U.S. legislative sessions
1956 U.S. legislative sessions